Silen may refer to:

 Silen, Bulgaria, a village in Bulgaria
 Silen language, a language of Indonesia
 Johan Silén, Finnish sailor
 William Silen, Puerto Rican athlete

See also 
 Silenus, in Greek mythology
 Silene (disambiguation)
 Sillen
 Selene (disambiguation)
 Seline (disambiguation)
 Cilen